The Roach River is a river in Piscataquis County, Maine. The Flow sequence through the ponds is from the Fourth Roach Pond through the Third Roach Pond, Second Roach Pond, and First Roach Pond to empty into Moosehead Lake, the source of the Kennebec River, in Spencer Bay (T1, R14, WELS). The Seventh Roach Pond drains through the Sixth Roach Pond in a separate tributary to the Third Roach Pond. No fifth Roach Pond is shown on modern maps.

The headwaters of the Roach River, as well as Second Roach Pond, Third Roach Pond, and Fourth Roach Pond, lie on land purchased by the Appalachian Mountain Club in 2009. In 2014, a section of Roach River, which was viewed as essential nursery habitat for young fish, was temporarily dewatered during dam reconstruction on land owned by the Club.

First Roach Pond

First Roach Pond is the largest of the Roach Ponds and extends across the north part of Frenchtown Township. Spawning tributaries Inlet Brook enters the east end of the pond, and Lagoon Brook enters the south shore of the pond near the dam. The pond offers good habitat for lake trout and land-locked Atlantic salmon. Lake whitefish disappeared from the pond in the 1970s, and brook trout populations have been declining since yellow perch became established in the 1990s. The outlet dam is intended to provide a barrier against migration of white perch and smallmouth bass from Moosehead Lake.

Second Roach Pond

Second Roach Pond extends along the southern edge of Maine township 1, range 12, reaching across the northern border of Shawtown township. Roach River enters the east end of the pond, and overflows through remains of a dam at the west end of the pond. The dam was built for early 20th-century log driving, but use of the dam ceased in 1969, and the remains were washed out in 1983. Summer temperatures in the pond are unfavorable for trout and salmon, and survival of stocked salmon has been poor since whitefish disappeared from the pond in the 1970s. Native rainbow smelt may fare poorly in competition with yellow perch which reached the pond after the dam was abandoned.

Third Roach Pond

Third Roach Pond is in eastern Shawtown township. Summer water temperatures are unfavorable for native trout which do poorly in competition with introduced yellow perch; but the Maine Department of inland Fisheries and Wildlife has stocked the pond with salmon, and a few splake may reach the pond from the adjacent Fourth Roach Pond.

Fourth Roach Pond

Fourth Roach Pond is west of and adjacent to Third Roach Pond in eastern Shawtown township. The two ponds are connected by a short narrows and maintain similar water elevation. Summer water temperatures are unfavorable for native trout which do poorly in competition with introduced yellow perch; but the Maine Department of Inland Fisheries and Wildlife stocks the pond with splake.

Sixth and Seventh Roach Ponds
Sixth Roach Pond overflows into Third Roach Pond  to the south, and receives drainage from Seventh Roach Pond  to the east in Maine township A, range 11. Summer temperatures are unfavorable for brook trout, but a few move into the pond from tributaries.

See also
List of rivers of Maine

References

Maine Streamflow Data from the USGS
Maine Watershed Data From Environmental Protection Agency

Rivers of Piscataquis County, Maine
North Maine Woods
Tributaries of the Kennebec River
Rivers of Maine
Appalachian Mountain Club